The Grand Hustle is an American reality competition. The show features a group of sixteen men and women who compete for a six-figure salary position working under Clifford "T.I." Harris. Each episode focuses on the contestants' reactions to a particular challenge, while Harris observes the contestants back at an Atlanta mansion alongside his business partners and associates.

The 51 Minds produced show follows the contestants across a dozen hour-long episodes that take place in Atlanta.

Harris serves both as star and as executive producer on the show, along with fellow Executive Producers Brian Sher, Christian Sarabia, Vinnie Kaufman and Johnny Petillo. Petillo served as a producer on Donald Trump’s former reality show The Apprentice, and on Survivor, which explains the show's similarities to both series. T.I. says he distinguishes himself from Trump—and fellow hip-hop business reality show maven Diddy—by the way he interacts with the contestants. He emphasizes face-to-face, honest feedback and treats his employees like family.

Gameplay 
"T.I. is looking to expand his Grand Hustle business empire and is on the hunt for a highly skilled executive to join the team. Set in Atlanta, this reality competition series features sixteen men and women competing in various challenges for the coveted position, with a six-figure salary, within T.I.'s multimillion-dollar company, which he built from the ground up. The hopefuls serve up big deals and even bigger doses of drama each week, en route to one being crowned the Grand Hustler."

The contestants are progressively eliminated from the game as they are voted out by Harris until one remains and is awarded the grand prize and joins The Grand Hustle.

History 
The first season consisted of twelve episodes. The series premiered on BET on July 20, 2018.

Cast
Yonathan Elias
Krystal Garner
Ivan Parker
George Ray III
Jennifer 'Ms Fer' Russell

Contestants

Episodes

Season 1
Season 1 began on July 20, 2018 and concluded on October 4, 2018.

References

External links
 
 

BET original programming
English-language television shows
2010s American reality television series
2018 American television series debuts
Television series by 51 Minds Entertainment
Television series by Endemol
T.I.